Chipeta or White Singing Bird (1843 or 1844 – August 1924) was a Native American woman, and the second wife of Chief Ouray of the Uncompahgre Ute tribe. Born a Kiowa Apache, she was raised by the Utes in what is now Conejos, Colorado. An advisor and confidant of her husband, Chipeta continued as a leader of her people after his death in 1880.

She was an Indian rights advocate and diplomat. She used diplomacy to try to achieve peace with the white settlers in Colorado and in 1985, Chipeta was inducted into Colorado Women's Hall of Fame.

Background
Chipeta, "White Singing Bird" in the Ute (Shoshonean) language, was born into the Kiowa Apache tribe in about 1843 or 1844. She was adopted and raised by the Uncompahgre Utes of present-day Colorado. She learned their traditional ways and became a skilled artisan in beadwork and tanning.

In 1859, she married Chief Ouray of the Uncompahgres, becoming his second wife. She came to act as his advisor and confidant, often sitting beside him at tribal council meetings. In 1863, Chipeta and her husband helped create the first treaty of Conejos, Colorado. Chipeta's brother, Sapinero, was jealous of Ouray's power and tried to murder him to which he failed. Ouray took out his knife in order to kill the traitor but Chipeta grabbed it out of the sheath before Ouray could grab it, thus saving her brother's life. Described as "beautiful", she played the guitar and sang in three languages. Chipeta was also renowned for her exquisite beadwork.

One time upon learning of a raid to be done on her white neighbors by the Utes she quickly traveled on her pony and swam the Gunnison River to warn the settlers of the raid, saving their lives. She rescued a white woman and her children from hostile Utes after a four-day ride. The family recounts: "Chief Ouray and his wife did everything to make us comfortable. We were given the whole house and found carpets on the floor, lamps on the tables and a stove with fire brightly burning. Mrs. Ouray shed tears over us." Both Chipeta and her husband were known for helping white settlers travel through the wilderness such as showing them the direction of a ford to cross a river.

Although Chipeta never bore children, she adopted four and raised them as her own, although one account does say that she did bear one son who was stolen by a band of Kiowas.

Ute leader and wise woman

Chipeta sought to live peacefully with the white settlers in Colorado. Tensions were rising as the settlers drove off game the Utes needed to survive. In addition, the government, through the White River Indian Agency, was pressing the Utes to take up farming, give up racing their horses, and convert to Christianity. The Ute resentment boiled up in an uprising in September 1879, marked by the Meeker Massacre at the Agency, where the Utes killed 11 white men and took three women and two children captive. In a related battle at Milk Creek, the Utes pinned down forces from Fort Steele for several days before reinforcements arrived.

The Uncompahgre did not take part in the uprising.  General Charles Adams, a former US Indian agent, negotiated release of the captives. One of the captives was Josephine Meeker, adult daughter of the late Indian agent Nathan Meeker. The captives were brought to Chipeta and Ouray's home after their release. Adams held an inquiry into the events in Colorado.

On January 7, 1880, Chipeta and Chief Ouray led a delegation of Utes to Washington, DC to negotiate a treaty regarding reservation resettlement.  They also had been asked to testify before a congressional inquiry into the Ute uprising. As Chipeta and the other Utes attempted to board a train at Alamosa, they were almost lynched by an angry mob of white people, who believed them associated with the Meeker Massacre.

On March 7, 1880, Chipeta was welcomed as a delegate by Secretary of Interior Carl Schurz at the US Capitol. She testified before a Congressional inquiry into the Meeker Massacre. At the hearing, she took the witness stand and answered, through an interpreter, the 10 questions put to her.

The Utes ratified a treaty with the US government; however, they were forced to leave Colorado and resettle on a reservation in Utah. Both the White River and Uncompahgre Utes were forced out.  Following passage of the Ute Removal Act of 1880, Chipeta and other Utes were removed to the Uintah Indian Reservation in Utah. Chief Ouray died in Ignacio, Colorado earlier that year. After his death, the reservation was renamed to honor him.  Chipeta continued as a leader of the Utes and was highly respected as a wise woman.

Life on the reservation 

Chipeta was a very respected woman on the reservation. The government promised her a house to be built and fixed up on the reservoir however this was never truly conceived. The government instead put her in a two-roomed house on the White River without any furniture. This house was in a location where there could be no irrigation so Chipeta relied on rations given to her by government officials. Even though she was gifted this house, she used her teepee, living alongside other traditional Ute peoples in her community. Oftentimes officials had to turn away people from the rations claiming that they were for Chipeta. Chipeta was known to be very kind and thankful for whatever the government officials did for her and was never known to be demanding.

She lived her life until the end as a traditional elder- living by the old ways, in a teepee, wearing traditional garments and was surrounded and supported by her tribal people. She once was gifted more than 100 dollar bills and gave them to others who could actually value them because of the unimportance it had in her day to day life.

She was also very respected by member of the tribe and was always allowed to meetings of the council in which no other Ute woman was ever accepted. When entertaining guests, Chipeta would prepare and cook meals herself with her own utensils without any help from other women. Chipeta eventually became blind in her late age.

Death 
Chipeta died from chronic gastritis on August 20, 1924 at the Uintah and Ouray Reservation in Utah. Those in her community buried her in a traditional way which didn't include boxes, meaning her body was in ground and because of this in 1925, Ute Indian agent F.A. Gross got approval from her living brother, John McCook, to move her body and give her a tomb. On March 15, 1925, she was reburied at the site of her former home near Montrose, Colorado. Her new burial site, the Ouray Memorial Park, on the day of the move was honored with 5,000 guests showing up to pay their respects. On May 25, 1925, remains believed to be that of Ouray were reburied in the cemetery on the Southern Ute reservation.

See also

 List of Native American artists
 Visual arts by indigenous peoples of the Americas

References

Further reading
 Becker, Cynthia S., and P. David Smith, Chipeta: Queen of the Utes, Lake City, Colorado: Western Reflections Publishing, 2003
 Jenson, H. Bert, "Chipeta: Glory and Heartache", The Outlaw Trail Journal, n.d., Salt Lake City, Utah, on Utah State University, Unintah Basin Education Center website

External links

1840s births
1924 deaths
Year of birth uncertain
19th-century Native Americans
American women artists
Apache people
Artists from Colorado
Native American bead artists
Native American leaders
Native American women artists
Ute people
Women beadworkers
19th-century Native American women
20th-century Native American women
20th-century Native Americans